Craft is a 2010 Brazilian film directed by Gustavo Pizzi. It stars Karine Teles, who co-wrote the screenplay with Pizzi, as a stage actress who must do parallel jobs for living. This stops when she enters on an international production, in which the director decides to do a film about her life.

Cast
Karine Teles as Bianca
Camilo Pellegrini as Mauricio
Otávio Müller as Oscar
Dany Roland as Thomas
Lucas Gouvea as Filipe
Gisele Fróes as Efignia
Otto Jr. as Rodrigo
Danilo Watanabe as Pedro
Patricia Pinho 
Cecilia Hoeltz

Production and themes
Gustavo Pizzi's directorial debut film, Craft uses several film stocks and formats, such as 16mm, 8mm, and high definition. Justifying it, Pizzi says that "It is like a voiceover without voice," as the different formats can "communicate" with the audience in each specific scene. The 8mm allows Pizzi to shows Bianca's most personal feelings to the viewers, for example. In another scene, however, there are the use of six cameras to film musical sequence of the in-film film.

The story is based on Karine Teles' real life experience as she was selected to appear in Rio Sex Comedy but was later replaced. On the film's theme, Pizzi stated he wanted to question how talent and luck are associated on one's career:

Reception
Upon its release, it has been well received, mostly for Teles' performance. Craft had its world premiere held at the 2010 Rio Film Festival, where Teles received the Best Actress Award. Teles won the same award at the 2011 Gramado Film Festival, where the film also garnered the Best Director, Best Screenplay and Best Music awards. At the 2011 Cartagena Film Festival, Craft was nominated for the Best Film Award. Mark Adams of ScreenDaily declared, "[Craft] may well be a familiar tale but it has a good-natured honesty as well as a series of fine performances that help make it memorable." Writing for Variety, Jay Weissberg dubbed Teles' acting as "terrific" and said, "It's been a while since a film captured an actor's world with the intelligence, creativity and insight of Craft."

References

External links

2010 drama films
Brazilian drama films
Brazilian independent films
2010 directorial debut films
2010 independent films
2010 films
2010s Portuguese-language films